Electronic rock is a music genre that involves a combination of rock music and electronic music.

Electronic rock may also refer to:

 Electronics in rock music

Subgenres
 Alternative dance, from the 1980s
 Dance-punk, from the 1970s
 Electronicore, from the 2000s
 Electropunk, from the 1970s
 Indie electronic, from the 1990s
 Industrial rock, from the 1970s
 Krautrock, from the 1970s
 New Music, a broad rock music movement from the 1970s–80s
 New Romantic, a subcategory
 New wave music, from the 1970s
 Post-punk, originally a synonym and later a distinguished genre
 Synth-pop, as above
 Electropop, as above
 Progressive rock, from the 1970s
 Art rock, originally a synonym and later a distinguished genre
 Psychedelic rock, from the 1960s

See also
 Electronic music